The 1965 Soviet football championship was the 33rd seasons of competitive football in the Soviet Union and the 27th among teams of sports societies and factories. Torpedo Moscow won the championship becoming the Soviet domestic champions for the second time.

Honours

Notes = Number in parentheses is the times that club has won that honour. * indicates new record for competition

Soviet Union football championship

Class A First Group

Class A Second Group

For places 1-16

Match for 1st place
 [Nov 25, Grozny]
 Ararat Yerevan  2-1  Kayrat Alma-Ata

For places 17-32

Class B

Russian Federation finals

Final group
 [Nov 13–20, Nalchik]

Ukraine (second stage)

For places 1-6

For places 7-12

Union republics finals
 [Nov 19–24, Baku]

Additional final
 Dinamo Kirovabad  0-0 Dinamo Baku  
 [Dinamo Kirovabad won by draw of lots]

Top goalscorers

Class A First Group
Oleg Kopayev (SKA Rostov-na-Donu) – 18 goals

References

External links
 1965 Soviet football championship. RSSSF